Pilchaca District is one of nineteen districts of the province Huancavelica in Peru.

References